The arrondissement of Nantes is an arrondissement of France in the Loire-Atlantique department in the Pays de la Loire region. It has 76 communes.

Composition

The communes of the arrondissement of Nantes, and their INSEE codes, are:

 Aigrefeuille-sur-Maine (44002)
 Basse-Goulaine (44009)
 Le Bignon (44014)
 La Boissière-du-Doré (44016)
 Bouaye (44018)
 Bouguenais (44020)
 Boussay (44022)
 Brains (44024)
 Carquefou (44026)
 La Chapelle-Heulin (44032)
 La Chapelle-sur-Erdre (44035)
 Château-Thébaud (44037)
 Cheix-en-Retz (44039)
 La Chevrolière (44041)
 Clisson (44043)
 Corcoué-sur-Logne (44156)
 Cordemais (44045)
 Couëron (44047)
 Divatte-sur-Loire (44029)
 Geneston (44223)
 Gétigné (44063)
 Gorges (44064)
 La Haie-Fouassière (44070)
 Haute-Goulaine (44071)
 Indre (44074)
 Le Landreau (44079)
 Legé (44081)
 La Limouzinière (44083)
 Le Loroux-Bottereau (44084)
 Machecoul-Saint-Même (44087)
 Maisdon-sur-Sèvre (44088)
 La Marne (44090)
 Mauves-sur-Loire (44094)
 Monnières (44100)
 La Montagne (44101)
 Montbert (44102)
 Mouzillon (44108)
 Nantes (44109)
 Orvault (44114)
 Le Pallet (44117)
 Paulx (44119)
 Le Pellerin (44120)
 La Planche (44127)
 Pont-Saint-Martin (44130)
 Port-Saint-Père (44133)
 La Regrippière (44140)
 La Remaudière (44141)
 Remouillé (44142)
 Rezé (44143)
 Rouans (44145)
 Saint-Aignan-Grandlieu (44150)
 Saint-Colomban (44155)
 Sainte-Luce-sur-Loire (44172)
 Sainte-Pazanne (44186)
 Saint-Étienne-de-Mer-Morte (44157)
 Saint-Étienne-de-Montluc (44158)
 Saint-Fiacre-sur-Maine (44159)
 Saint-Herblain (44162)
 Saint-Hilaire-de-Clisson (44165)
 Saint-Jean-de-Boiseau (44166)
 Saint-Julien-de-Concelles (44169)
 Saint-Léger-les-Vignes (44171)
 Saint-Lumine-de-Clisson (44173)
 Saint-Lumine-de-Coutais (44174)
 Saint-Mars-de-Coutais (44178)
 Saint-Philbert-de-Grand-Lieu (44188)
 Saint-Sébastien-sur-Loire (44190)
 Sautron (44194)
 Les Sorinières (44198)
 Le Temple-de-Bretagne (44203)
 Thouaré-sur-Loire (44204)
 Touvois (44206)
 Vallet (44212)
 Vertou (44215)
 Vieillevigne (44216)
 Vue (44220)

History

The arrondissement of Nantes was created in 1800. In January 2017 it lost four communes to the new arrondissement of Châteaubriant-Ancenis.

As a result of the reorganisation of the cantons of France which came into effect in 2015, the borders of the cantons are no longer related to the borders of the arrondissements. The cantons of the arrondissement of Nantes were, as of January 2015:

 Aigrefeuille-sur-Maine
 Bouaye
 Carquefou
 La Chapelle-sur-Erdre
 Clisson
 Legé
 Le Loroux-Bottereau
 Machecoul
 Nantes-1
 Nantes-2
 Nantes-3
 Nantes-4
 Nantes-5
 Nantes-6
 Nantes-7
 Nantes-8
 Nantes-9
 Nantes-10
 Nantes-11
 Orvault
 Le Pellerin
 Rezé
 Saint-Étienne-de-Montluc
 Saint-Herblain-Est
 Saint-Herblain-Ouest-Indre
 Saint-Philbert-de-Grand-Lieu
 Vallet
 Vertou
 Vertou-Vignoble

References

Nantes